John Stoward Moyes  (25 July 1884 – 29 January 1972) was an Australian Anglican bishop and author.

History
Moyes was born in Koolunga, a son of John Moyes (died 1927), headmaster of Port Pirie and Thebarton high schools, and his wife Ellen Jane Moyes, née Stoward (died 1898).
He was educated at St Peter's College, Adelaide and the University of Adelaide. Ordained in 1908  he began his career with curacies at St Paul's, Port Pirie and St Mary's, Lewisham.  Next he held incumbencies at St Cuthbert's Prospect and St Bartholomew's Norwood during which time he became Archdeacon of Adelaide. In 1929 he was appointed Bishop of Armidale, a post he held for 35 years.

Social issues 
Moyes was a proponent of the social gospel, having been influenced by his observation of extremes of wealth and poverty during his tenure at Lewisham.

Moyes was a prominent opponent of the 1950 Act of Parliament and the 1951 referendum to ban the Communist Party of Australia.  Advocating for the "no" case, Moyes said:

Moyes was also a prominent opponent of the Vietnam War.

Family
Moyes married Helen Margaret Butler (1882–1970) in 1909. She was a daughter of Richard Butler, Premier of South Australia.
Helena Margaret Moyes (1910–2001)
Guy Stoward Moyes (1915–2004)
Peter Morton Moyes (1917–2007)
Philip Richard Moyes (1918– )
Monica Mary Moyes (1924– )

His wife died in 1970 and the following year he remarried to Mary Scott Pentreath (nee Holland). His brother, Captain M. H. Moyes OBE RAN, was a member of Douglas Mawson's Antarctic expedition and the rescue of Shackleton; another brother, Lieutenant Colonel A. G. Moyes MBE MC, was an international cricketer and journalist.

References

1884 births
People from Koolunga, South Australia
People educated at St Peter's College, Adelaide
University of Adelaide alumni
Archdeacons of Adelaide
20th-century Anglican bishops in Australia
Anglican bishops of Armidale
Companions of the Order of St Michael and St George
1972 deaths